This article serves as an index – as complete as possible – of all the honorific orders or similar decorations awarded by Penang, classified by Monarchies chapter and Republics chapter, and, under each chapter, recipients' countries and the detailed list of recipients.

Awards

MONARCHIES

Governors of Penang 

 Abdul Rahman Abbas (Governor of Penang :  - present) : 
 Order of the Defender of State :
  Member (DJN)
  Companion (DMPN)
  Knight Grand Commander (DUPN)
  Grand Master
  Yang Amat Berbahagia Toh Puan Datuk Seri Utama Hajah Majimor Binti Sharif, his wife :
  Knight Grand Commander of the Order of the Defender of State (DUPN)

 STATES of MALAYSIA

Governors of Sarawak 

 Abang Muhammad Salahuddin ( 3rd & 6th List of Yang di-Pertua Negeri of Sarawak 2 April 1977 – 2 April 1981 & since 22 February 2001 ) :
  Knight Grand Commander of the Order of the Defender of State (DUPN)  with title Dato’ Seri Utama

To be completed if any new decorations for :

to be completed

 ASIAN MONARCHIES

to be completed

 EUROPEAN MONARCHIES

to be completed

REPUBLICS 

to be completed

See also 
 Mirror page : List of honours of the Governors of Penang by country

References 

 
Penang